Rachel Marie Parsons (born November 19, 1997) is an American former competitive ice dancer. With her brother Michael Parsons, she is the 2018 NHK Trophy bronze medalist and a four-time silver medalist on the ISU Challenger Series (2018 CS Asian Open, 2018 CS Nebelhorn Trophy, 2018 CS Lombardia Trophy, 2017 CS Ondrej Nepela Memorial). Earlier in their career together, the Parsons won gold at the 2017 World Junior Championships, the 2016 Junior Grand Prix Final, and in the junior event at the 2017 U.S. Championships. They placed 4th at the 2012 Winter Youth Olympics.

Personal life
Rachel Parsons was born November 19, 1997 in Rockville, Maryland. She has two siblings – Michael and Katie. In 2016, she graduated from Magruder High School in Rockville, Maryland and currently attends Flagler College in St. Augustine, Florida. In August 2019, she came out as bisexual.

Parsons participated in the June 1, 2020 protests in Lafayette Square, after concluding that "sitting at home and being angry wasn’t doing enough. I wanted to protest. I wanted to physically be there."  She was hit by a rubber bullet when federal security services opened fire.  A photograph of Parsons was featured on the June 2, 2020 edition of The Washington Post.

Parsons now goes to Flagler College and works as a bartender at St. Augustine Fish Camp.

Career

Early years 
Rachel Parsons started skating at age six because she wanted to learn how to stand up on the ice. After joining the Wheaton Ice Skating Academy in June 2006, she started focusing solely on ice dance. With Kyle MacMillan, she won gold on the juvenile level at the 2009 U.S. Championships and then gold on the intermediate level at the 2010 U.S. Championships.

She teamed up with her older brother, Michael, in February 2010. They won gold on the novice level at the 2011 U.S. Championships and debuted on the Junior Grand Prix (JGP) series in September 2011, placing 9th in Gdańsk, Poland. After taking the junior pewter medal at the 2012 U.S. Championships, they represented the United States at the 2012 Winter Youth Olympics, placing 4th. They were also selected for the 2012 World Junior Championships in Minsk, Belarus, where they finished 15th.

Competing in the 2012–13 JGP series, the Parsons placed 6th in Linz, Austria, before taking bronze in Zagreb, Croatia.

2013–14 season 
The Parsons obtained silver at both of their 2013–14 JGP assignments, which took place in Košice, Slovakia, and Ostrava, Czech Republic. They qualified for the JGP Final in Fukuoka, Japan, where they placed sixth. The duo won bronze at the junior level at the 2014 U.S. Championships and capped off their season with an 8th-place finish at the 2014 World Junior Championships in Sofia, Bulgaria.

2014–15 season 
The Parsons medaled at both their 2014–15 JGP assignments, receiving bronze in Aichi, Japan, and silver in Zagreb, Croatia. They finished as the first alternates for the JGP Final and won silver on the junior level at the 2015 U.S. Championships. Concluding their season, they placed fourth at the 2015 World Junior Championships in Tallinn, Estonia.

2015–16 season: Junior World silver 
During the 2015–16 JGP series, the Parsons were awarded gold in Bratislava, Slovakia, and Zagreb, Croatia. Competing in Barcelona, Spain, at their second JGP Final, the siblings took the bronze medal behind Lorraine McNamara / Quinn Carpenter and Alla Loboda / Pavel Drozd, having placed second in the short dance and fifth in the free. At the 2016 World Junior Championships in Debrecen, Hungary, they placed first in the short and second in the free, winning the silver medal behind McNamara/Carpenter.

2016–17 season: Junior World gold 
Competing in their sixth JGP season, the Parsons were awarded gold in Yokohama, Japan, and Dresden, Germany, both times ahead of Russia's Anastasia Shpilevaya / Grigory Smirnov. In December 2016, they competed at the JGP Final in Marseille, France; ranked second in the short and first in the free, they won the title by a margin of 0.63 over Loboda/Drozd.

The following month, the Parsons would win their first junior national title at the 2017 U.S. Championships, over 11 points clear of the field. The siblings would cap off their undefeated season by winning the 2017 World Junior Championships; similar to the 2016–17 JGP Final, the Parsons won the event overall after placing second in the short and first in the free, earning an even narrower victory of 0.56 ahead of Loboda/Drozd. The Parsons earned personal bests in their combined total and free dance scores at their fifth trip to the Junior Championships.

2017–18 season: International senior debut 
Moving to the senior level, the Parsons debuted at the Lake Placid Ice Dance International, winning the silver medal behind longtime rivals McNamara/Carpenter, who were also making their senior debut.  They then took the silver medal at the 2017 CS Ondrej Nepela Trophy, their debut on the ISU Challenger series.  Assigned to two Grand Prix events, they finished ninth at Skate America and seventh at the Rostelecom Cup.  They then competed at a second Challenger event, the Golden Spin of Zagreb, where they finished eighth.

Competing at the senior level at the 2018 U.S. Championships, they placed fifth, and thus did not qualify for the U.S. Olympic team.  They were instead sent to the 2018 Four Continents Championships, where they finished sixth.

2018–19 season: Final season 

After a second straight silver medal at Lake Placid's summer ice dance event, the siblings competed in three straight Challenger events, winning consecutive silver medals at the Asian Open, Nebelhorn Trophy and Nepela Trophy.  At their first Grand Prix event in Japan, the 2018 NHK Trophy, they won their first and only Grand Prix medal, a bronze.  At the 2018 Internationaux de France, their second Grand Prix, they finished fifth.  At the 2019 U.S. Championships, the Parsons placed sixth.

On April 2, 2019, Rachel announced on Instagram that she was retiring from figure skating following a lengthy struggle with an eating disorder.  Her brother Michael intended to continue skating, and subsequently formed a new partnership with Caroline Green.

Programs
(with Michael Parsons)

Competitive highlights
(with Michael Parsons)

GP: Grand Prix; CS: Challenger Series; JGP: Junior Grand Prix

References

External links

 
 Rachel Parsons / Michael Parsons at IceNetwork.com

American female ice dancers
1997 births
Sportspeople from Rockville, Maryland
Living people
People from Derwood, Maryland
American LGBT sportspeople
Bisexual women
LGBT figure skaters
LGBT people from Maryland
Figure skaters at the 2012 Winter Youth Olympics
World Junior Figure Skating Championships medalists
21st-century American women